Prunus korshinskyi (syn. Amygdalus korshinskyi (Hand.-Mazz.) Bornm.) is a species of Prunus in the family Rosaceae. It was first discovered in Syria, and is also locally native in Turkey and southeastern Europe. It is threatened by habitat loss. It is a deciduous shrub growing to 3.5 m tall, related to the almond.

Cultivation and uses
The seeds are edible though bitter, similar to a bitter almond. They can be used either raw or cooked.

References

External links
 

korshinskyi
Flora of Turkey
Vulnerable plants
Taxonomy articles created by Polbot